The Swatch FIVB World Tour 2004 was the official international beach volleyball tour for 2004.

The USA won seven, and Brazil five, of the 12 women's tournaments, of the 2004 tour. Brazil also won nine of the 14 men's tournaments.

Grand Slam
There were three Grand Slam tournaments. These events give a higher number of points and more money than the rest of the tournaments.

Berlin, GermanySmart Grand Slam, June 22–27, 2004
Marseille, FranceWorld Series 13, July 13–18, 2004
Klagenfurt, AustriaA1 Grand Slam presented by Nokia, 29 July – 1 August 2004

Schedule
Key

Tournament results

Women

Men

Rankings

Men

Women

Medal table by country

References

Beach Volleyball Database

External links
 2004 Swatch FIVB World Tour - tour calendar at FIVB.org

 

2004 in beach volleyball
2004